South Korean girl group Twice held their debut concert under the name Twice 1st Tour: Twiceland – The Opening at SK Olympic Handball Gymnasium in Seoul on February 17–19, 2017. This was followed by debut concerts in Bangkok and Singapore in April, and the tour concluded with an additional two concerts in Seoul in June. In July, they held their debut concert in Japan. They embarked on their first Japan tour in January 2018 under the name Twice Showcase Live Tour 2018 "Candy Pop", before subsequently touring Singapore once again later that year.

In 2019, a "Twicelights" tour was announced, starting with a two-day concert at the KSPO Dome, followed by various concerts throughout Asia. Shortly after their third subsequent yearly concert in Singapore, they ventured out of Asia for their only time, hosting four concerts in North America, three in the United States and one in Mexico. Following further concerts throughout Asia for the rest of the year and the next, concerts scheduled after February 2020 were canceled due to the COVID-19 pandemic. Twice's fourth world tour, "III", started with a two-day concert (originally three) in Seoul in December 2021.

Twice 1st Tour: Twiceland – The Opening

Twice Debut Showcase "Touchdown in Japan"

Twice Showcase Live Tour 2018 "Candy Pop"

Twice 2nd Tour: Twiceland Zone 2 – Fantasy Park

Twice 1st Arena Tour 2018 "BDZ"

Twice Dome Tour 2019 "#Dreamday"

Twice World Tour 2019 "Twicelights"

Twice 4th World Tour "III"

Twice 5th World Tour "Ready to Be"

Online concerts

Beyond Live – "Twice: World in a Day" 

On August 9, Twice held their first online concert titled "Twice: World in a Day" in response to their "Twicelights World Tour Finale" which had been canceled earlier in the year. The group worked with the Beyond Live platform launched by SM Entertainment and Naver for the concert, becoming the first artist outside of SM Entertainment to host an online concert using the platform.

A replay VOD was uploaded on October 30.

Multicam VODs were uploaded on November 30.

Accolades

NTT Docomo Connect Special Live – Twice in Wonderland 

On March 6, the group held their second online concert titled "Twice in Wonderland", which was first announced on January 14. The concert was held in partnership with NTT Docomo and was broadcast using various technologies including AR (augmented reality) and MR (mixed reality). At the end of their online concert, Twice announced the release of the Japanese single "Kura Kura", which was released on May 12.

Notes

References 

Twice
Twice
Tours